Raccards are traditional granaries that can be found in parts of the Minho, north of Portugal (called Espigueiro), in Galicia and Asturias, north-west of Spain, Swiss Alps (usually in Valais) and in the Italian Alps (in the Lys Valley and in Ayas). In Italy they are called rascard and in Savoy regard.  They are found in the Valle d'Aosta region of Italy.

These pre-industrial structures resemble log cabins, built above ground and supported by wooden stilts. A circular stone slab, forming an overhang, is intercalated between the stilts and the granary to prevent rodents from gaining access to the grain or fodder reserves. Raccards allow for preserving and processing grain products.

See also
 Hórreo

References

Granaries

pt:Espigueiro